The A28 is a trunk road in the counties of Kent and East Sussex in south east England, connecting Margate, Canterbury, Ashford and Hastings.

Starting at the seaside resort of Margate at the north-east point of Kent, the A28 runs inland and west-southwest to the cathedral city of Canterbury, before passing through the chalk hills of the North Downs via the gap cut by the River Stour, to the town of Ashford in the Vale of Holmesdale. From here, the A28 proceeds via the market town of Tenterden, to the East Sussex seaside town of Hastings, on the English Channel.

Route 
The A28 leaves Margate via the seaside resorts of Westgate and Birchington, and then heads inland reaching open countryside at the village of Sarre, after which the road roughly parallels both the Ashford-Ramsgate railway line and the Great Stour river on their combined route to Canterbury and then Ashford.

From Sarre, the road passes through the villages of Upstreet, Hersden and Sturry, and then to the city of Canterbury. It forms part of Canterbury's ring road before leaving via Wincheap and Thanington Without, where a sliproad linking to the A2 was completed in 2011.

The A28 passes between the North Downs via the villages of Chartham, Chilham, Godmersham and Bilting, to enter the Vale of Holmesdale. The road reaches surburbia again at Kennington, a suburb of Ashford, but the A28 then skirts around the town centre of Ashford on a section of dual carriageway, where it has a junction with the A20. In 1983, this section was named Simone Weil Avenue, in honour of the French philosopher and mystic who is buried nearby in Bybrook Cemetery. Bypassing the village of Great Chart, the road undulates in a general south-westward direction around the Kentish Weald via the villages of Bethersden and High Halden, to the market town of Tenterden.

The A28 continues via the villages of Rolvenden and Newenden before crossing a narrow bridge over the River Rother and entering East Sussex via Northiam, beyond which the road becomes very winding. After the village of Brede there is a steep descent to bridge the river of the same name. Next is Westfield, just before the road climbs to terminate at its junction with the A21 just north of Hastings.

Improvements 
Work has continued to improve the A28 into the 21st century. In 2011 a new slip road was completed to connect the road to the A2 in Canterbury.

References

Roads in England
Transport in the Borough of Ashford
Transport in East Sussex
Roads in Kent
City of Canterbury
Hastings